Connor Evans (born 24 January 2002) is a South African rugby union player for the  in the Currie Cup. His regular position is lock.

Evans was named in the  side for the 2022 Currie Cup Premier Division.

References

South African rugby union players
Living people
Rugby union locks
Western Province (rugby union) players
2002 births
Stormers players